LAMB4 is a laminin gene.

Laminins